Elections to Herefordshire Council were held on 1 May 2003, along with other local elections in England and Scotland. Due to prior boundary reviews, all 38 wards were contested - with each ward electing either one two or three members to the council, with each successful candidate serving a four-year term of office, expiring in 2007. The council remained in no overall control, with the Conservative Party replacing the Liberal Democrats as the largest party on the council, winning 20 out of a total of 56 seats on the council.

Result

The overall turnout was 60.80% with a total of 114,492 valid votes cast. A total of 2,808 ballots were rejected.

Council Composition
Prior to the election the composition of the council was:

After the election, the composition of the council was:

G - Green Party 
NL - No description

Ward Results
Asterisks denote incumbent Councillors seeking re-election. Councillors seeking re-election were first elected in 2000, and these results are therefore compared to that year's polls. All results are listed below:

Aylestone

Backbury

Belmont

Bircher

Bringsty

Bromyard

Andrews previously served as a cllr for Three Elms.
Both Haycock and Paton previously stood as BNP candidates.

Burghill, Holmer & Lyde

Makin previously served as cllr for Dinmore Hill

Castle

Central

Credenhill

Frome

Golden Cross with Weobley

Cllr Goodwin previously served as councillor for Weobley.

Golden Valley North

Cllr Davies previously served as councillor for Merbach.

Golden Valley South

Hagley

Hampton Court

Hollington

Hope End

Kerne Bridge

Kington Town

Cllr James previously served as councillor for Kington.

Ledbury

This ward previously only elected two members to the council. Both Cllrs Harling and Ashton served in the Ledbury ward, whilst Cllr Rule served as a councillor for Marcle Ridge.

Leominster North

Leominster South

Both Cllrs Burke and Thomas previously served as councillors for Leominster East & South prior to the election.

Llangarron

Mortimer

Old Gore

Penyard

Pontrilas

Ross-on-Wye East

Ross-on-Wye West

St. Martins & Hinton

Cllrs Chappell and Attfield previously served as councillors for Hinton ward, and Cllr Preece served as a councillor for St. Martins prior to the election.

St. Nicholas

Stoney Street

Sutton Walls

Cllr Guthrie previously served as the councillor for Brumarsh prior to the election.

Three Elms

Tupsley

Valletts

Wormsley Ridge

References

2003
2003 English local elections
21st century in Herefordshire